Ross Carson Skeate (born 2 August 1982 in Johannesburg, South Africa) is a rugby union player.

He returned to South Africa on a two-year deal from July 1, 2010 after spending just under two years at French Top 14 side Toulon.

He moved to France after the completion of the 2008 South African season. He played for the Stormers franchise in the Super 14 and for Western Province in the domestic Currie Cup competition. Skeate has played for the Emerging Springboks (2007).

He's a skillful 'number 5' lock renowned for his line-out jumping prowess, physicality and prominence in the loose. At school he was a South African junior basketball player.

References

http://www.RossSkeate.com (Ross Skeate Official Site)

External links
http://www.rctoulon.com/effectifs-5-249.php#infosjoueur
http://www.iamastormer.com/profile/default.php?user_id=1710
http://www.wprugby.com/playerprofiles.asp?Id=114
http://www.sarugby.com/news/News/authid=30.html

http://www.itsrugby.co.uk/player_2317.html

1982 births
Living people
RC Toulonnais players
South African rugby union players
Stormers players
Western Province (rugby union) players
Expatriate rugby union players in France
Sharks (Currie Cup) players
Sharks (rugby union) players
Rugby union locks
Rugby union players from Johannesburg
White South African people
University of Cape Town alumni
South African expatriate rugby union players
South African expatriate sportspeople in France
Alumni of South African College Schools